Gregory W. Allen (born June 4, 1963) is a former American football running back in the National Football League. He was drafted by the Cleveland Browns in the second round of the 1985 NFL Draft. He played college football at Florida State.

Allen also played for the Tampa Bay Buccaneers.

College career
Allen was Florida State's all-time leading rusher with 3,769 yards until Warrick Dunn broke it in 1996. He was a consensus All-American in 1983 after rushing for 1,134 yards with 13 touchdowns.

See also
 List of NCAA major college football yearly scoring leaders

References

External links
Florida State Seminoles bio

1963 births
Living people
All-American college football players
American football running backs
Cleveland Browns players
Florida State Seminoles football players
People from Milton, Florida
Tampa Bay Buccaneers players